Jyothibai  Pariyadath is a poet, translator,transcriber and blogger in Malayalam language  from Palakkad, Kerala, India. Born on 26 April 1965 in Nemmara village in Palakkad  district, as seventh child of  Anthikkaad Puzhukoloth Krishna Panicker and Nemmara Pariyadath Sathybhama Amma. She did her studies at Pazhayagramam GLP  School, Govt.Girls high school Nemmara and NSS college Nemmara. She Completed her graduation in Chemistry and post graduation in sociology and Malayalam. She is Married to Kunduveettil Janardhananan.

Career
Jyothibai  actively started writing poems in  periodicals in  2008  periodicals such as  Kalakaumudi and madhyamam weekly.  Her first work is a transcription Mayilammaoru jeevitham which is about Mayilamma the  tribal warrior of Plachimada struggle against the   Coca-Cola company. This book was translated to Tamil language as Mayilamma Porattame vazhkai by sukumaran, published in 2007, English translation were included in different universities as a study material for cultural and environmental studies.
She was a member of the Purogamana Kala Sahitya Sangham state committee, O. V. Vijayan Smarakasamithi, Palakkad district Public library. Was in the editorial board of the book' Palakkad Sthalam Kalam Charithram' which describes the cultural history of Palakkad published DTPC Palakkad.
She published  two blogs  (poems and translations) and Kavyam Sugeyam. Which is an audio blog . She herself recited several poems of many renowned poets  in Malayalam. She was a judge in the Kirali Mambazham poetry recital reality show in two seasons. Was a member of the kavyanjali  panel for reciting poems in All India Radio Thrissur Station.

Works

Poem
 2009 - Pesamatantha, Fabian books & 2015 - Sahithya Pravarthaka Co-operative Society
 2017-  Kodich, Chintha publishers 
 2021- Mooliyalankari, DC Books

Translation
 2009- La Notte - Script of the movie La Notte of Michelangelo Antonioni
 2013- Mayakowski kavithakal - poems of Vladimir Mayakovsky

Transcription
 2006 Mayilammaoru jeevitham, MathrubhumiBooks
 2007 Mayilamma Porattame Vazhkai -Tamil translated by  Sugumaran, published by  Ethir Veliyedu
 2018 Mayilamma the story of a Tribal eco warrior - English translated by Prof. Swarnalatha Rangarajan, of IIT Madras and Dr. Sreejith Varma, of Christ University, published by Orient 
Black swan hydarabad

Awards
 2010- Kovai cultural centre literary award (pesamatantha)
 2021- Muthukulam  Parvathiyamma smaraka Sahithya puraskaram.(Mooliyalankari)

References 

 Poetry in a sweet voice 
 ജ്യോതിഭായ് പരിയേടത്തിന്റെ കവിത.
 You can listen to poems on this blog in Kozhikode 
 O.V. Vijayan literary awards announced 
 Mayilamma: The Life of a Tribal Eco-Warrior - -on a tribal widow who fights for cause 
 Book Launch: Mayilamma, The Life of an Eco-Tribal Warrior | Professor Swarnalatha and Mr. Sreejith

External links
 
 
 
 
 
 
 
 
 
 
 
 

Malayali people
Living people
1965 births
Writers from Kerala
Women writers from Kerala
Malayalam poets
Indian women poets